Centruroides anchorellus is a species of scorpion in the family Buthidae.

References

anchorellus
Animals described in 1976